Arauz or Araúz is a surname of Basque origin. Notable persons with that name include:
 Blanca Aráuz (1909–1933), first National Heroine of Nicaragua
 Félix Arauz (born 1935), Ecuadorian painter
 Hansell Araúz (born 1989), Costa Rican football player
 Jonathan Araúz (born 1998), Panamanian professional baseball player
 José María Araúz de Robles Estremera (1898–1977), Spanish politician, businessman and bull breeder
 Marcelo Araúz Lavadenz (born 1934), Bolivian festival director, culture promoter, choir leader, and music educator
 Oscar Araúz (born 1980), Bolivian football player
 Randall Arauz, Costa Rican environmentalist specialist in shark conservation
 Reina Torres de Araúz (1932–1982), Panamanian anthropologist, ethnographer and professor
 Vanessa Arauz (born 1989), Ecuadorian football manager

See also 
 Arauz Formation, a fossiliferous stratigraphic unit in Spain